Retsil is an unincorporated community in Kitsap County, Washington, United States.  It is located on the Puget Sound, and is known for its veterans facilities.  Retsil is located within the Parkwood Census-designated place (CDP).

A post office called Retsil was established in 1915, and remained in operation until 1966. The community's name is that of Governor Ernest Lister, reversed.

See also
 List of geographic names derived from anagrams and ananyms

References

Unincorporated communities in Washington (state)
Unincorporated communities in Kitsap County, Washington